Antonijs Černomordijs (born 26 September 1996) is a Latvian football player. He plays for Riga. He is also the captain of the Latvia national football team.

Club career
He made his Cypriot First Division debut for Pafos on 26 August 2017 in a game against Ethnikos Achna.

International career
He made his debut for Latvia national football team on 6 September 2019 in a 2020 Euro qualifier against Austria, as a starter.

International goals
Scores and results list Latvia's goal tally first.

References

External links
 
 
 

1996 births
Sportspeople from Daugavpils
Living people
Latvian footballers
Latvia youth international footballers
Latvia under-21 international footballers
Latvia international footballers
BFC Daugavpils players
Lech Poznań II players
Riga FC players
Pafos FC players
Latvian Higher League players
III liga players
Cypriot First Division players
Latvian expatriate footballers
Expatriate footballers in Poland
Expatriate footballers in Cyprus
Association football defenders
Latvian expatriate sportspeople in Cyprus